Witcomb is a surname. Notable people with the surname include:

Alexander Witcomb (1838–1905), British photographer
Bethan Witcomb, British actress
Doug Witcomb (1918–1999), British football player
Nan Witcomb, Australian poet

See also
Witcomb Court
Witcomb Cycles